Isla Palomino is a small, uninhabited island located to the east of Puerto Rico, near the coast of Las Croabas in Cabezas barrio, Fajardo.

Geography 
Coral reefs, seagrass beds, and rocky coast species are among the natural attractions found in Isla Palomino. Another attraction was the tiny island Palominito (which means tiny Palomino).

Economy 
Isla Palomino is the largest of three private islands near Puerto Rico, the other two being Isla de Ramos and Isla de Lobos. The island is owned by the descendants of Alberto Bachman Glauser, the Bachman Family and the Fuertes Bachman Family. Most of the island is rented to El Conquistador Resort for their beach and water activities. www.puertoricoboatrentals.com provides private yacht charters to the island. A ferry is used to get guests to the island, which takes approximately 12 minutes. Palomino horses can be rented by guests for horse-back riding on the beach.

Gallery

References

External links

Fajardo, Puerto Rico
Islands of Puerto Rico
Private islands of the United States
Private islands of the Caribbean
Uninhabited islands of the United States